The Competition is a 1980 American drama musical film starring Richard Dreyfuss, Amy Irving and Lee Remick, written and directed by Joel Oliansky.

Plot
Paul Dietrich, a gifted but disillusioned classical pianist, is nearly 30 years old. He has never won a major piano competition and will soon be past the age limit to compete. Paul has accepted a job as a music teacher at a prep school in his hometown of Chicago, needing to help his mother and ailing father. However, he decides to compete one final time at an international piano competition in San Francisco, even though it could cost him the job.

The competition for a financial grant and two years of concert engagements pits the intense and arrogant Paul against a select group of talented artists. He advances to the final round of six, which includes brash New Yorker Jerry DiSalvo, who can only play one concerto; Michael Humphries; Canadian pianist Mark Landau; and a meek Kazakh girl, Tatiana Baronova.

Another contestant, Heidi Joan Schoonover, is a confident 23-year-old from Massachusetts who was romantically attracted to Paul after meeting him at an earlier music festival. Heidi's esteemed music teacher, Greta Vandemann, advises her to avoid letting personal matters hinder her concentration. Heidi is rebuffed by Paul, who also wants to avoid any distraction.

Before the finals, Tatiana's music teacher defects, causing the emotionally fragile Tatiana to have a nervous breakdown and the competition to be postponed for a week. Meanwhile, Paul's mother wants him to withdraw from the competition and focus on the teaching job, as his father is very ill and should no longer be working to support Paul's musical ambitions. Paul stays in the competition but feels guilty. He lashes out at Heidi during a meeting with the other contestants and the arrogant conductor.

Paul later apologizes to Heidi and they have a coffee date. Afterwards, at his hotel room, he pours his heart out to her about his family situation. Greta worries that Heidi and Paul's relationship may cost Heidi her competitive edge.

The competition is rescheduled. A reception for the contestants unexpectedly turns into a press conference for Tatiana, who is returning to the competition after meeting with her teacher. Paul is infuriated, believing sympathy for Tatiana is making her the favorite to win the competition. He criticizes Heidi for defending Tatiana and accuses her of not taking the competition seriously. Heidi realizes how much winning means to Paul and wants to drop out. Greta angrily chastises Paul, blaming him for exploiting Heidi's guilt over competing against him.

Paul tells Heidi that he loves her and persuades her to stay in the competition. Partway through her performance, Heidi's piano develops a technical problem, forcing her to stop. Rather than folding under pressure, Heidi demands to play a different concerto, requiring an orchestral rearrangement. She performs magnificently and wins the competition; Paul finishes in second place.

Heidi is ecstatic because she and Paul had agreed to form a partnership, combining their talents and resources to help one another, no matter who won. To her dismay, Paul is upset to realize that she is a more proficient player. He tells her he is unable to honor their partnership and leaves. However, Paul finally arrives at the celebration party following the competition, ready to take part in Heidi's victory and to be in her life.

Cast
Richard Dreyfuss as Paul Dietrich
Amy Irving as Heidi Joan Schoonover
Lee Remick as Greta Vandemann
Sam Wanamaker as Andrew Erskine
Joseph Cali as Jerry DiSalvo
Ty Henderson as Michael Humphries
Vicki Kriegler as Tatiana Baronova
Adam Stern as Mark Landau
Bea Silvern as Madame Gorshev
Gloria Stroock as Mrs. Dietrich
Philip Sterling as Mr. Dietrich
Priscilla Pointer as Mrs. Donellan
James B. Sikking as Brudenell
Delia Salvi as Mrs. DiSalvo

Music
The Los Angeles Philharmonic OrchestraConducted by Lalo Schifrin
Ginastera, Piano Sonata No. 1Eduardo Delgado, Pianist
Brahms, Piano Concerto No. 1Ralph Grierson, Pianist
Chopin, Piano Concerto in E minorLincoln Mayorga, Pianist
Prokofiev, Piano Concerto No. 3 in C MajorDaniel Pollack, Pianist
Beethoven, Piano Concerto No. 5Chester B. Swiatkowski, Pianist
 LOVE THEME - THE COMPETITION(People Alone)Music by Lalo SchifrinLyrics by Wilbur JenningsSung by Randy Crawford

Awards and nominations

References

External links

Soundtrack Recording

1980 films
1980 romantic drama films
American musical drama films
American romantic drama films
American romantic musical films
Columbia Pictures films
Films about competitions
Films about pianos and pianists
Films set in San Francisco
Films shot in San Francisco
Films scored by Lalo Schifrin
1980s English-language films
1980s American films